Selvaratnam  may refer to 

 Daniel Selvaratnam Thiagarajah,  Sri Lankan Tamil bishop.
 Karu Selvaratnam,  Malaysian sprinter.
 Rohan Selvaratnam, Malaysian cricketer.
 Selva Selvaratnam, British businessman.
 Tanya Selvaratnam, Author and activist.
 Saravana Selvaratnam, Branch of Saravana stores.

Hindu given names
Tamil masculine given names